Andsnes is a village in Loppa Municipality in Troms og Finnmark county, Norway. The village is the westernmost village in Finnmark county. It is located on the mainland part of Loppa Municipality, at the mouth of the Kvænangen along the Lopphavet, a part of the Norwegian Sea. There are no road connections to the rest of Norway, so the village is only accessible by boat.

References

Villages in Finnmark
Loppa
Populated places of Arctic Norway